Franck Prazan (born 1966) is a French art collector and the owner of Applicat-Prazan gallery in Paris. He specialises in School of Paris, a Post-War abstract painting movement, whose main artists include Jean-Michel Atlan, Pierre Soulages, Serge Poliakoff, Nicolas de Staël.

The Applicat-Prazan gallery regularly attends international modern art fairs, such as artgenève, Tefaf Maastricht, Art Basel Hong Kong, Tefaf New York Spring, Art Basel Basel, Frieze Masters, Foire Internationale d'Art Contemporain, Art Basel Miami Beach.

Read Franck Prazan's blog.

Biography
Franck Prazan graduated from European Business School. He then occupied managerial positions at Dior Couture, Cartier International and Philippe Charriol.

In 1996, he joined Christie's France as Managing Director. As such, he oversaw its development from a simple representative office to a fully fledged auction house, moving the company to the Avenue Matignon in Paris.

He succeeded his father, Bernard Prazan, in 2004 and has been running the gallery since then. In 2010, the gallery opened a second site on the Right Bank at 14 avenue Matignon.

In 2017, Franck Prazan was contacted to sell two paintings by Jean Dubuffet and Georges Mathieu on behalf of the Museum of Modern Art (MoMA), New York.

Franck Prazan has been a Member of the Board of Trustees at TEFAF from 2017 to 2021.

Since 2022, Franck Prazan seats at the selection committee of Art Basel in Basel.

Exhibitions
2006 : Schneider, Œuvres majeures autour d’un tableau d’exception 
2007 : Mes années 50, Collection Alain Delon
2007 : Présence, silences, hommage à Geer van Velde 
2008 : Serge Poliakoff 
2008 : Jean-Michel Atlan 
2009 : Dialogues l Autour de Pierre Soulages
2010 : Jean-Michel Atlan, les détrempes
2010 : Jean-Pierre Pincemin 
2010 : Panorama Jean Fautrier
2011 : 14 Matignon, Exposition inaugurale
2012 : André Masson
2012 : Alfred Manessier, Tours, Favellas et autres œuvres monumentales 
2013 : Maurice Estève, works on paper
2013 : Serge Poliakoff
2014 : Georges Mathieu
2015 : Maurice Estève, Paintings
2016 : Zoran Music
2018 : Le grand œil de Michel Tapié
2019 : Justice! 2 chefs-d’œuvre de Roger-Edgar Gillet
2019 : BBB
2022 : Georges Mathieu, Paintings 1951-1962

References

1966 births
French art collectors
Living people